Springfield Plantation House  is the oldest wood-frame house in Fort Mill, South Carolina and was the site of one of the last meetings of the Confederate cabinet. It was listed on the National Register of Historic Places in 1985.

History
The house was originally constructed between 1790 and 1806 by John Springs III and his wife first occupied the house. In the 1850s, the house was extensively remodeled by Andrew Baxter Springs and his architect, Jacob Graves of Columbia. In 1946, Elliot White Springs put on an addition toward the rear, and modernized the house with electricity, plumbing and central heat.

The house and plantation was the site of one of the last meetings of the Confederate cabinet. President Jefferson Davis and several of his cabinet officers spent the night of April 26, 1865 at the plantation. The next day, they held a meeting to plan their further retreat. The owner of the plantation, Andrew Baxter Springs, recommended that they travel separately to avoid capture.

Architecture
The house is a two-story, white weatherboard house with a gable roof and pedimented gable ends. There are two one-story wings on either side with gable roofs. There is a one-story porch with hipped roof supported by eight Ionic columns. There are five windows across the second story and four windows and a double entrance door across the first story. Each wing has two windows on the front side of the house. The main block as brick corbeled chimneys on both ends. There is a two-story addition toward the rear. The house has a composition roof.

References

Houses on the National Register of Historic Places in South Carolina
Houses completed in 1806
Houses in York County, South Carolina
National Register of Historic Places in York County, South Carolina